Desvres is a commune in the Pas-de-Calais department in northern France. It is a market town, known for its pottery. In 2018 its population was 4,930 inhabitants. It is the seat of the canton of Desvres.

Population

See also
Communes of the Pas-de-Calais department

References

External links

 Desvres 
 Musée de la Céramique

Communes of Pas-de-Calais